The 2021 Aaha! Rara Gold Cup is the 19th edition of the Aaha Gold Cup held in Pokhara and organised by Sahara Club. 8 teams participated in the tournament. All matches were held at the Pokhara Rangasala. Due to a sponsorship deal with Him-Shree Foods (a Pokhara-based food company), the tournament is officially known as the 19th Aaha! Rara Gold Cup 2021. Which is named after its flagship product, "RARA" instant noodles.

Participating teams
 Sahara Club (Pokhara)
 APF Club
 Machhindra Football Club
 African Roots Association
 Sankata Club
 Manang Marshyangdi Club
 Ruslan Three Star
 Nepal Police Club

Knockout stage

Matches

Quarter-finals

Semi-finals

Final

Season statistics

Scoring

Top scorers

Awards

References

Aaha! Gold Cup
Sport in Pokhara
2020–21 in Nepalese football